The Union of European Football Associations (UEFA) is the governing body for association football in Europe. It organises four club competitions: the UEFA Champions League (formerly European Cup), the UEFA Europa League (formerly UEFA Cup), the UEFA Europa Conference League, and the UEFA Super Cup. UEFA was also responsible for the Cup Winners' Cup and the Intertoto Cup until their discontinuation in 1999 and 2008, respectively. Together with the Confederación Sudamericana de Fútbol (CONMEBOL), it also organised the Intercontinental Cup, which was last held in 2004, before its replacement by FIFA's Club World Cup.

Spanish side Real Madrid have won a record total of 24 titles in UEFA competitions, seven more than Milan (Italy). Before the establishment of the Europa Conference League in 2021–22, the only team to have won every UEFA club competition was Juventus (Italy). They received The UEFA Plaque on 12 July 1988, in recognition of winning the then three seasonal confederation trophies – the UEFA Cup in 1977, the Cup Winners' Cup in 1984, and the European Cup in 1985, the first club to do so. Juventus additionally won their first Super Cup in 1984, their first Intercontinental Cup in 1985, and the Intertoto Cup in 1999.

Spanish clubs have won the most titles (64), ahead of clubs from Italy (49) and England (45). Italy is the only country in European football history whose clubs won the three main competitions in the same season: in 1989–90, Milan retained the European Cup, Sampdoria won the Cup Winners' Cup, and Juventus secured the UEFA Cup.

While the Inter-Cities Fairs Cup is considered to be the predecessor of the UEFA Cup, it is not officially recognised by UEFA and therefore successes in this competition are not included in this list. Also excluded are the unofficial 1972 European Super Cup and the Club World Cup, a FIFA competition.

Winners

By club
Real Madrid holds the record for the most titles overall with 24, followed by Milan's 17 titles. Spanish teams hold the record for the most wins in each of the three main UEFA club competitions: Real Madrid, with 14 European Cup/UEFA Champions League titles; Sevilla, with 6 UEFA Cup/UEFA Europa League titles; and Barcelona, with 4 Cup Winners' Cup titles. Milan share the most Super Cup wins (5) with Barcelona and Real Madrid, and the most Intercontinental Cup wins (3) with Real Madrid. German clubs Hamburger SV, Schalke 04 and VfB Stuttgart, and Spanish club Villarreal are the record holders in the UEFA Intertoto Cup (two titles each).

Before the Europa Conference League was established in 2021–22, Juventus, Ajax, Bayern Munich, Chelsea, and Manchester United were the only teams to win all of UEFA's three main club competitions (European Cup/UEFA Champions League, Cup Winners' Cup, UEFA Cup/UEFA Europa League). Juventus additionally won the Super Cup, the Intertoto Cup and the Intercontinental Cup, making it the only team to win six different UEFA competitions.

The following table lists all the clubs that have won at least one UEFA club competition, and is updated as of the 2022 UEFA Super Cup played on 10 August 2022 (in chronological order).

 The column for each competition wikilinks to the article about those finals.

By country
Spanish clubs are the most successful in UEFA competitions, with a total of 64 titles, and hold a record number of wins in the European Cup/UEFA Champions League (19), UEFA Super Cup (16), and UEFA Cup/UEFA Europa League (13). Italian clubs are second with 49 titles and have the most victories in the Intercontinental Cup (7). In third place, English clubs have secured 45 titles, including a record 8 wins in the Cup Winners' Cup. French clubs, ranked sixth on the list, have won the Intertoto Cup the most times (12). Italian clubs have a distinction of being the only ones who have won the three main UEFA competitions in the same season (1989–90).

The following table lists all the countries whose clubs have won at least one UEFA competition, and is updated as of the 2022 UEFA Super Cup played on 10 August 2022 (in chronological order).

See also
UEFA club competition records and statistics

Notes

References
General

Specific

External links
UEFA official website

 

Association football-related lists